Kingo may refer to:

 Kingo Chunagon (1577–1602), a 16th century Japanese military figure
 Kingo Sunen, a fictional superhero
 Thomas Kingo (1634–1703), Danish bishop, poet and hymn-writer